Charles Cross may refer to:

 Charles Cross (American football) (born 2000), American football player
 Charles Cross (Australian politician) (1891–1955), Australian politician
 Charles Cross (diver) (1887–1963), British Olympic diver
 Charles Cross (footballer) (1900–?), for Crystal Palace and Coventry City
 Charles Frederick Cross (1855–1935), British chemist
 Charles R. Cross, American journalist
 Charles T. Cross (1922–2008), American diplomat and ambassador
 Charles Whitman Cross (1854–1949), American geologist
 Charles Wilson Cross (1872–1928), Canadian politician
 Charles Allen Lechmere (1849–1920), Jack the Ripper suspect